Barbara Benkó (born 21 January 1990) is a Hungarian former cross-country mountain biker. Born in Budapest, Benko competed in the Women's cross-country at the 2012 Summer Olympics, held at Hadleigh Farm, finishing in 27th place.

Major results
Sources: 

2008
 2nd  Junior cross-country, UCI Mountain Bike & Trials World Championships
2009
 1st  Cross-country, National Mountain Bike Championships
 6th Cross-country, UEC European Under-23 Mountain Bike Championships
2010
 1st  Cross-country, National Mountain Bike Championships
 3rd Time trial, National Road Championships
 5th Cross-country, UEC European Under-23 Mountain Bike Championships
 7th Under-23 cross-country, UCI Mountain Bike & Trials World Championships
2011
 1st  National Cyclo-cross Championships
2012
 1st  Cross-country, National Mountain Bike Championships
2013
 1st  Cross-country, National Mountain Bike Championships
2014
 1st  Cross-country, National Mountain Bike Championships
 1st  National Cyclo-cross Championships
 World University Cycling Championship
2nd  Cross-country
2nd  Cross-country time trial
 2nd Road race, National Road Championships
2015
 1st  Cross-country, National Mountain Bike Championships
 1st  National Cyclo-cross Championships
 3rd Road race, National Road Championships
 10th Cross-country, UEC European Mountain Bike Championships
2016
 1st  Cross-country, National Mountain Bike Championships
 1st  National Cyclo-cross Championships
 2nd Road race, National Road Championships
2017
 National Mountain Bike Championships
1st  Cross-country marathon
1st  Cross-country
 1st  National Cyclo-cross Championships
 3rd  Cross-country marathon, UEC European Mountain Bike Championships
 9th Cross-country, UCI Mountain Bike World Championships
2018
 1st  Road race, National Road Championships
 1st  Cross-country, National Mountain Bike Championships
 1st  National Cyclo-cross Championships
 5th Cross-country marathon, UEC European Mountain Bike Championships
2019
 1st  Cross-country, National Mountain Bike Championships
 2nd National Cyclo-cross Championships
2020
 National Road Championships
1st  Time trial
3rd Road race
 2nd Cross-country, National Mountain Bike Championships
2021
 National Mountain Bike Championships
1st  Cross-country short-track
2nd Cross-country
 National Road Championships
2nd Time trial
2nd Road race

References

External links

Hungarian mountain bikers
Hungarian female cyclists
Living people
Olympic cyclists of Hungary
Cyclists at the 2012 Summer Olympics
1990 births
Cyclists from Budapest